Gökdeniz Karadeniz (born 11 January 1980) is a Turkish former professional footballer who played as a winger or as an attacking midfielder.

Club career

Trabzonspor
Karadeniz played his first professional match for Trabzonspor in the 1999–00 season at the senior level and made ten appearances. He was at first used in defensive roles by his manager, but was gradually given a more and more offensive role in the team until the 2003–04 season when he was given an attacking midfield role. His lightning step and effective understanding with teammate Fatih Tekke enabled him to lead the club in scoring that season with 13 goals.

Rubin Kazan
On 13 March 2008, he signed a five-year deal with the Russian club Rubin Kazan worth €8.7 million. Karadeniz mentioned that it was sad for him to leave Turkey and also said he chose the club because he felt that if he had joined a big team in Europe his club would not have gotten as much money for him. With the team he won the Russian Premier League 2008.

On 20 October 2009, Karadeniz scored the winning goal to shock the Barcelona fans at Camp Nou, winning the match for Rubin Kazan.

On 5 May 2018, Karadeniz announced he will be retiring at the end of the 2017–18 season. His shirt number (61) was permanently retired by Rubin.

International career
He played his national team debut against Czech Republic national football team on 30 April 2003. He also played 2 times for Turkey B national football team for Future Cup matches against Scotland and Germany and 16 times for Turkey U21. He was called up for the UEFA Euro 2008 for Turkey.

Career statistics

International goals

Honours
Trabzonspor
Turkish Cup: (2): 2002–03, 2003–04

Rubin Kazan
Russian Premier League: (2): 2008, 2009
Russian Cup: 2011–12
Russian Super Cup: (2) 2010, 2012
Commonwealth of Independent States Cup: 2010
Marbella Cup: 2012

Turkey
FIFA Confederations Cup: 3rd place (1): 2003
UEFA European Championship: 3rd place (1): 2008

References

External links
 
 

 Profile on TFF.org

1980 births
Living people
Sportspeople from Giresun
Turkish footballers
Turkey international footballers
Turkey B international footballers
Turkey youth international footballers
Turkey under-21 international footballers
Turkish expatriate footballers
Turkish expatriate sportspeople in Russia
Süper Lig players
Trabzonspor footballers
FC Rubin Kazan players
2003 FIFA Confederations Cup players
UEFA Euro 2008 players
Russian Premier League players
Expatriate footballers in Russia
Association football midfielders